The 1922–23 Indiana State Sycamores men's basketball team represented Indiana State University during the 1922–23 NCAA men's basketball season. The head coach was Birch Bayh, coaching the Sycamores in his fifth season. The team played their home games at North Hall in Terre Haute, Indiana.

This season marked the Sycamores first "twenty-win" season and their 11th winning season over a twelve-season span.

Schedule

|-

References

Indiana State Sycamores men's basketball seasons
Indiana State
Indiana State
Indiana State